Trioctylphosphine is an organophosphorus compound with the formula P(C8H17)3 sometimes abbreviated TOP. It is usually encountered as a syrup.  The compound is colorless.

Reactions
Trioctylphosphine reacts with oxygen to form trioctylphosphine oxide.  For this reason it is usually handled with air-free techniques.

TOP reacts with elemental selenium to give trioctylphosphine selenide (TOPSe), which is a reagent for the preparation of cadmium selenide and related semiconductors.

See also
 Triphenylphosphine
 Trioctylphosphine oxide

References

Phosphines